Iğdır Province is a province in eastern Turkey, located along the borders with Armenia, Azerbaijan (the area of Nakhchivan Autonomous Republic), and Iran. Its adjacent provinces are Kars to the northwest and Ağrı to the west and south. It occupies an area of 3,587 km2 and population of 184,418 (2010 est.), it was 168,634 in 2000 (up from 142,601 in 1990). The province considered part of Turkish Kurdistan and has a Kurdish majority with a pretty close Azerbaijani minority.

It was created from southeastern part of the former Kars Province in 1993. The current Governor of the province is Hüseyin Engin Sarıibrahim. Being the highest mountain in Armenian Highlands, Mount Ararat (Ağrı Dağı) is at present in Turkey's Iğdır province, but much of the land is a wide plain far below the mountain. The climate is the warmest in this part of Turkey; cotton can be grown in Iğdır. The closed border with Armenia follows the Aras River.

The provincial capital is the city of Iğdır.

Districts 

Iğdır province is divided into four districts (capital district in bold):
 Aralık
 Iğdır
 Karakoyunlu
 Tuzluca

History 

Archaeological research has uncovered Hurrian settlements in the Iğdır region going back to 4000 BC. The area was part of the Urartu kingdom circa 800 BC. There is a Urartu statuary in the area. It remained under Urartian control until its transition to the Median Empire, Persian Empire, Alexander The Great, Orontid Dynasty of the Kingdom of Armenia. Seleucid, Parthian, Roman, Sassanid and Byzantine forces were prominent from the 4th century BC, followed by the Arab armies of Islam in 646. Turks, Georgians and Mongols fought through here for 400 years from 1064 onwards until the area was settled by Kara Koyunlu and then Ak Koyunlu Turkic tribes in the early 15th century.

For centuries, constant warfare ensued between the two arch rivals, the Ottoman Empire and the Persian Empire from 1534 until 1746. The region, most of the time remaining in Persian hands, was officially ceded once again in 1746, when subsequently most of its land within the province of Iğdır today became part of the Erivan khanate, a Muslim principality in Persia. The northern part of the province remained in Persian hands until after the Russo-Persian War, 1826–1828 when it became part of the Russian Empire under the Treaty of Turkmenchay. Under Russian administration, the area became the Surmali uyezd (with its capital at the city of Iğdır) of the Armenian Oblast and later the Erivan Governorate. The southern half of the province remained in Ottoman hands through most of the 19th century but was incorporated into the Russian Empire as a result of the Russo-Turkish War of 1877–78.

Towards the end of World War I, the whole area came under the administration of the First Republic of Armenia as part of Ararat province. After an attack into the territory by the Turkish army, Iğdır was ceded to Turkey by the Soviet government under the Treaty of Kars. A substantial Armenian population remained in the area throughout this history of struggle between great powers. Armenians formed the ethnic majority in the city of Iğdır itself until 1919–1920 when most either died or fled due to starvation during the Turkish–Armenian War. It was part of the former Province of Beyazıt between 1922 and 1927, part of Ağrı Province between 1927 and 1934, and finally part of Kars Province between 1934 and 1993, before becoming a separate province.

Demographics

Within the Russian Empire

Estimate of 1886 
The area of the present-day Iğdır Province was administered by the Russian Empire as part of the Surmalu Uyezd between 1828 and 1918. According to the Russian family lists accounts from 1886, of the total 71,066 inhabitants of the districts 34,351 were Azerbaijanis (48.3%, mentioned as 'Tatars' in the source), 22,096 Armenians (31.1%) and 14,619 Kurds (20.6%).

Russian Empire census (1897) 
According to the Russian Empire Census in 1897, the town of Iğdır had a population of 4,680, of which 3,934 (84%) were Armenians, and 559 (12%) were Russians. The district had a population of 89,055 in 1897 of which Tatars (later known as Azerbaijanis) constituted  of the population, followed by  Armenians,  Kurds and  Slavs.

Caucasian Calendar (1917) 
According to the 1917 publication of the Caucasian Calendar, the Surmalu Uyezd had 104,791 residents in 1916, including 55,364 men and 49,427 women, 98,212 of whom were the permanent population, and 6,579 were temporary residents. The statistics indicated Shia Muslims to be the plurality of the population of the uyezd, followed closely by Armenians, Kurds and Yazidis:

Within the Republic of Turkey

Turkish census of 1927 
The whole population adhered to Islam.

From comparing the statistics available in 1916 and 1927, it is evident the population of the Iğdir Province lessened by 79,582, a decline of 76% over eleven years, which is indicative of the constant state of warfare, famine and turmoil in the district between 1918-1920.

By 2018, the population of the district reached 197,456, nearing double what it was a century prior.

Places of interest

 The caravanserai of Zor, believed to have been built by an Armenian architect in the 13th or 14th century, is located 35 km south-west of the city of Iğdır, and is named after the nearby village of Zor. It was one of halting places along the trade route between northern Persia and Georgia. Caravans used to stay over-here before passing over the Çilli pass. Restoration works have begun on the structure, which has been put under protection since 1988. The ruins of an Armenian church was once located in the same area, but today nothing remains of it.
 Surmari castle, 25 km west of the city of Iğdır, on the road to Tuzluca, in the village of Sürmeli, is the site of the medieval Armenian town of Surmari. However, it is currently inaccessible due to border restrictions.
 Statues with Ram Heads, Cementer stones with ram heads existing almost in all old cementers in Iğdır Plain are remnants from Kara Koyunlu period. These cementers of brave, heroic persons and young persons who had died in youth age.
 Aras Bird Research and Education Center, One of only four active bird research and banding (ringing) stations in Turkey. 204 bird species have been recorded so far in the wetlands along Aras River, Yukari Ciyrikli, Tuzluca. Bird enthusiasts can volunteer or visit to experience the diverse birdlife and traditional village life. From Kars to Igdir, turn immediately right 10 meter before the Aras bridge and drive 4 km to Yukari Ciyrikli village.

See also
List of populated places in Iğdır Province
Ararat Plain

References

 
States and territories established in 1992
Turkish Kurdistan